Vanishing Men is a 1932 American Western film directed by Harry L. Fraser and starring Tom Tyler, Adele Lacy, and Raymond Keane. The film depicts the story of Russ Whitely (Keane), a young man who has become involved with cattle rustling, his complicated relationship with Sheriff Doug Barrett (Tyler), and his eventual redemption. Critical reception to the film was mixed, and it is now believed to be a lost film.

Plot 
Russ Whitely has become involved in Heck Claiborne's cattle rustling. Facing arrest by Sheriff Doug Barrett, Claiborne's associate Luke Grimes shoots and kills O'Hara, the sheriff's deputy. Barrett asks Diane Melville to help influence Whitely to abandon his criminal connections, and hires gunslinger Bat Morrison as his new deputy. Morrison kills Grimes when he resists arrest. Claiborne informs Whitely of a plan to ambush and kill Barrett, but Whitely warns the sheriff. Unable to arrest the man who saved his life, Barrett resigns, and the new sheriff, Baker, tells Morrison to stop the rustlers. Morrison arrests Whitely, but Claiborne's gang meets them at the jail. Morrison shoots Whitely, and is killed in turn by Barrett. Baker arrests Claiborne and his gang, except the injured Whitely, who is allowed to return to his ranch and begin a new life.

Cast 

Tom Tyler as Sheriff Doug Barrett
Adele Lacy as Diane Melville
Raymond Keane as Russ Whitely
William L. Thorne as Bat Morrison
John Elliott as Heck Claiborne
Robert Seiter as O'Hara
Charles King as Butch Grimes
James A. Marcus as Baker
Dick Dickinson as Luke Grimes

Hollywood Filmograph remarked on Raymond Keane's return to film acting after an absence of over a year.

Production 
In 1931, the newly formed Monogram Pictures announced the titles of its first 28 films, to be produced and released over the following year, including eight Westerns starring Tom Tyler. Vanishing Men was released in the United States on April 15, 1932, and in the UK on June 3. In 1937, the film was re-released by Astor Pictures.

Reception and legacy 
Critical reception of the film was mixed. Writing for the Motion Picture Herald, Rita McGoldrick did not regard the film positively, and considered it most suited for an adult audience. The Los Angeles branch of the American Association of University Women wrote that the film offered "stilted" dialogue and "average entertainment value", but that its moral theme made it suitable for children as young as eight years old. Despite this initially mixed reception, The Film Daily'''s 1939 examination of the industry listed Vanishing Men as one of the Monogram films that "excited the admiration of followers" of the Western genre.

As with many of Monogram's films, Vanishing Men'' is believed to be lost.

Notes

References

Bibliography

External links 

American black-and-white films
American Western (genre) films
1932 Western (genre) films
1932 films
Lost American films
Lost Western (genre) films
Monogram Pictures films
1932 lost films
1930s English-language films
1930s American films